Ruth Horsting, also known as Ma Renu (née Ruth Carolyn Johnson; 1919–2000) was an American sculptor, professor, author, community organizer, philanthropist, and a student of Ashtanga Yoga. She is known for her bronze and steel sculptures, and taught at the University of California, Davis from 1959 to 1971. Horsting was the first female sculptor hired in the entire University of California system. 

Horsting was the founder and former president of the Sri Ram Foundation, a co-founder of the Hanuman Fellowship, and the co-founder of the Mount Madonna Center located in the Santa Cruz Mountains, above Watsonville.

Early life and education 
She was born as Ruth Carolyn Johnson on January 18, 1919 in Chicago, Illinois. Horsting attended Northwestern University, where she earned a B.A. degree (1940) and an M.F.A. degree (1959). Additional study was done at the School of the Art Institute of Chicago, from 1946 to 1950.

Career 
In 1959, she divorced and moved to California with her three children. Starting in 1959, Horsting taught at the University of California, Davis (UC Davis), initially within the Department of Home Economics and later transferring to the Department of Art. Horsting's work was often large scale bronze or steel sculptures, she used the lost wax method. 

In 1970, Horsting was given a teaching sabbatical and during this time she stayed at Sea Ranch, co-authored a book, and started a study of yoga. She co-authored with Rosana Pistolese the illustrated book, History of Fashions (1970), published by Wiley. The following year in 1971, her eldest son William Francis Horsting died at age 26, which prompted her to retire from teaching and start a journey of reflection. In 1971, Horsting sponsored monk and yoga master Baba Hari Dass to come to the United States, for the purpose of teaching yoga. At the age of 52, she became a full time student of Ashtanga yoga. 

Starting in 1978, Horsting and other yoga students and followers of Baba Hari Dass founded the Mount Madonna Center, which serves as a retreat, conference center, and K-12 school. Around 100 people had lived at the center too. Horsting began using the name "Ma Renu" (English: Mother Earth) while at the center. The Sri Ram Foundation was founded by Horsting and was dedicated in supported orphaned children in India. In India the foundation built the Sri Ram Ashram which is a home, school and medical facility for approximately 50 children. 

Horsting died on November 26, 2000 in her home in Bonny Doon, California. Her daughter, Archana Horsting is an artist and a co-founder of Kala Art Institute in Berkeley.

Art exhibitions 
 2016: Out Our Way, Jan Shrem and Maria Manetti Museum of Art, at University of California, Davis, Davis, California
1964: The Bay Area Artists, Crocker Art Museum, Sacramento, California
1964: Horsting with Bryan Wilson, Crocker Art Museum, Sacramento, California
 1963: (solo exhibition), University of Arizona, Tucson, Arizona
1962: Northern California Arts (NCA) annual show, Crocker Art Museum, Sacramento, California

Awards 
 1959: Pauline Palmer prize, Art Institute of Chicago

Publications

As author

As editor

References 

1919 births
2000 deaths
20th-century American women artists
American women sculptors
Northwestern University alumni
School of the Art Institute of Chicago alumni
University of California, Davis faculty
Artists from Chicago